Village Roadshow Studios are a set of film studios located in Oxenford, Gold Coast, Queensland, Australia. The studios are owned by Village Roadshow and consist of nine sound stages as well as a range of other production facilities. The studio commenced in June 1991 and is one of three film studios in Australia, the others being Disney Studios Australia in Sydney and Docklands Studios Melbourne.

The studios have been home to many feature films, telemovies, TV series and miniseries. Some feature film productions include Aquaman, San Andreas, The Chronicles of Narnia: The Voyage of the Dawn Treader, Scooby-Doo, House of Wax, Ghost Ship, and Thor: Ragnarok. TV productions have included H2O: Just Add Water,Terra Nova, BeastMaster and the Lost World series.

History 
Village Roadshow Studios opened in 1986 and was commissioned by Dino De Laurentiis for De Laurentiis Entertainment Limited (DEL). Village Roadshow purchased DEL and took over the facility in 1988. The Studios were built before WB Movie World in 1991 and they are adjacent to the Warner Bros. Movie World theme park. Despite their physical proximity and operational links, the studios and theme park are separate entities.

The theme park, and the studios' management have no involvement with productions and, as such, do not recommend cast, crew or extras. This is done independently by the production. However, experienced Warner Bros. Movie World staff are often involved in productions filmed at the studios. The studios are not open to the general public and as the productions are independently owned, permission to go on-set can only be obtained from the production itself.

In June 2004, a fire in Sound Stage 8, during the production of House of Wax, destroyed the sound stage.

Facility 
The facility consists of nine sound stages, three water tanks (two outdoor and one indoor; one of which is the largest purpose built film water tank in Australia), 10 production areas, five construction workshops, onsite support facilities, two wardrobe and laundry facilities, accounting services, lock ups, screening and editing, preview theatrette, visual effects studio, film processing, post production, travel and freight services, and much more.

In addition to producing a variety of television shows and films, the studios have also been used by the adjacent Warner Bros. Movie World theme park. When the two facilities opened in 1991, a Studio Tour was run from Warner Bros. Movie World throughout the production areas of the Village Roadshow Studios before returning to the Movie Magic Special Effects Show. In 2011, both Sound Stage 1 and 2 were utilised for the theme park's annual halloween event, Fright Nights. The Saw and Zombie Apocalypse mazes were housed in these studios throughout October.

In 2018, some sound stages were used for the 2018 Commonwealth Games and played host to sports such as boxing and table tennis. Temporary spectator seating was installed for a total of 6,200 people for the two sports.

Productions

Films 

 Untitled Godzilla vs. Kong sequel (2024)
 Elvis (2022)
 Godzilla vs Kong (2021)
 Dora and the Lost City of Gold (2019)
 Aquaman (2018)
 Guardians of the Tomb (2018)
 Thor: Ragnarok (2017)
 Pirates of the Caribbean: Dead Men Tell No Tales (2017)
 Jungle (2017)
 The Shallows (2016)
  Kong: Skull Island (2016)
 San Andreas (2015)
 Unbroken (2014)
 The Inbetweeners 2 (2014)
 My Mistress (2014)
 Return to Nim's Island (2013)
 The Railway Man (2013)
 Bad Karma (2012)
 Bait 3D (2012)
 Sanctum (2011)
 The Chronicles of Narnia: The Voyage of the Dawn Treader (2010)
 Daybreakers (2009)
 Triangle (2009)
 Beauty and the Beast (2009)
 Nim's Island (2008)
 Fool's Gold (2008)
 The Ruins (2008)
 The Condemned (2007)
 The Marine (2006)
 Superman Returns (2006)
 Aquamarine (2006)
 See No Evil (2006)
 The Great Raid (2005)
 House of Wax (2005)
 Peter Pan (2003)
 Tempted (2003)
 Ghost Ship (2002)
 Scooby-Doo (2002)
 Crocodile Dundee in Los Angeles (2001)
 Pitch Black (2000)
 Komodo (1999)
 The Phantom (1996)
 Mighty Morphin Power Rangers: The Movie (1995)
 No Escape (1994)
 Street Fighter (1994)
 Fortress (1992)
Hurricane Smith (1992)

TV series 
 "Mako Island of Secrets" – series 1 (2013) and 2 (2014)
 20,000 Leagues Under the Sea
 Animalia
 Beastmaster
 The Dumb Bunnies (co-production with YTV and Nelvana)
 Flipper
 Lost World
 Mission: Impossible
 Paradise Beach
 Rock Island Mysteries
 H2O: Just Add Water
 Sea Patrol 2
 Terra Nova

Clients

See also 

 Screen Queensland Studios
 Sports on the Gold Coast, Queensland
 Venues of the 2018 Commonwealth Games

References 

2018 Commonwealth Games venues
Australian film studios
Boxing venues in Australia
Table tennis venues
Buildings and structures on the Gold Coast, Queensland
Companies based on the Gold Coast, Queensland
Film production companies of Australia
 
Boxing at the 2018 Commonwealth Games
Table tennis at the 2018 Commonwealth Games
Squash at the 2018 Commonwealth Games